The Donut Hole is a bakery and landmark in La Puente, California. An example of programmatic architecture, the building is shaped like two giant donuts through which customers drive to place their orders. The bakery is one of the most photographed donut shops in the United States.

History
The first Donut Hole opened in 1963, in La Puente, California. According to one source, the shop in La Puente was the second to open, in 1968, and was followed by three others. However, various sources disagree and date the building's original construction from 1947 to 1958 to 1962.  What is certain is that the donut chain went out of business in 1979. The LaPuente donut hole was purchased by the Lopez family in 1979 and remained in the family until 2003.  The Covina branch was completely remodeled and the others were demolished, and only the La Puente location remains today as a working bakery.

It is a local tradition for newlyweds to drive through the donuts; some cite good luck as the reason, while others credit the sexual symbolism. The building has been struck by cars several times in its history, most recently in 2004 when an out-of-control car crashed through one of the donut facades.

Pop Culture

The building was featured in the movie Moving Violations where Chief Fromm's car was bashed.

It is shown in the opening scenes of the 1987 film Dragnet.

See also
 List of doughnut shops
 Randy's Donuts

References

1963 establishments in California
Bakeries of California
Doughnut shops in the United States
La Puente, California
Landmarks in Los Angeles
Novelty buildings in California
Restaurants in Los Angeles